Huang Hsiao-wen (born 31 August 1997) is a Taiwanese boxer. She won a medal at the 2019 AIBA Women's World Boxing Championships.

She is currently studying at Fu Jen Catholic University.

References

Living people
AIBA Women's World Boxing Championships medalists
Taiwanese women boxers
Bantamweight boxers
World bantamweight boxing champions
1997 births
Asian Games bronze medalists for Chinese Taipei
Boxers at the 2018 Asian Games
Asian Games medalists in boxing
Medalists at the 2018 Asian Games
Olympic boxers of Taiwan
Fu Jen Catholic University alumni
Medalists at the 2020 Summer Olympics
Olympic bronze medalists for Taiwan
Olympic medalists in boxing
Boxers at the 2020 Summer Olympics
21st-century Taiwanese women